Xenia Knoll and Amra Sadiković were the defending champions, but both players chose not to participate.

Andreea Mitu and Elena-Gabriela Ruse won the title, defeating Laura Pigossi and Maryna Zanevska in the final, 4–6, 6–3, [10–4].

Seeds

Draw

Draw

References
Main Draw

Montreux Ladies Open - Doubles
Lugano
Montreux Ladies Open